Ronald McKinnon (born September 20, 1973) is a former American football linebacker in the National Football League.  He was originally signed as an undrafted free agent by the Arizona Cardinals out of the University of North Alabama where he won three Division II National Championships.  He was the winner of 1995 Harlon Hill Trophy (Division II's equivalent to the Heisman Trophy).  He played for the Cardinals from 1996-2004.  He also played one season for the New Orleans Saints.
In 2008, he was inducted into the College Football Hall of Fame.

Early life
McKinnon attended at Elba High School in Elba, Alabama and led the Tigers to the 1989 State Championship.

Professional career

Arizona Cardinals
He was signed as a free agent in 1996 season by the Arizona Cardinals.

References

External links

1973 births
American football linebackers
Arizona Cardinals players
People from Elba, Alabama
Players of American football from Alabama
College Football Hall of Fame inductees
Living people
New Orleans Saints players
North Alabama Lions football players